Due to the conflicts in the region, Government of Kashmir may refer to:

Government of Azad Kashmir
Government of Jammu and Kashmir